Augustine's Italian Village, Inc. is a regional frozen food company located in New Castle, Pennsylvania, United States, part of the Pittsburgh metropolitan area. Augustine's Frozen Pizza can be found in Grocery and convenience stores throughout western Pennsylvania and eastern Ohio.

History

Augustine's Italian Village was started in 1957. The original site was 1909 E. Washington Street in New Castle, Pennsylvania (across from Cascade Park). Augustine's Italian Village then moved to 833 E. Lutton Street, New Castle, Pennsylvania in 1960. On November 8, 2015 Augustine's Italian Village had a fire and lost everything. They reopened and move to 427 Commerce Avenue, which is now their current location.

Since the fire, Augustine's Italian Village no longer has a take out restaurant.

Products

Augustine's Pizza manufactures six products for grocery stores, convenience stores, restaurants, schools, and concession stands. They are a 12” plain (grated Parmesan cheese) pizza, a 12” mozzarella cheese pizza, a 7” mozzarella cheese “Stadium” pizza, Syrian bread, spinach and cheese calzone, pepperoni and cheese calzone, and pizza shells.

Advertising and Sponsorship

Augustine's Pizza is the preferred frozen pizza of the Pittsburgh Steelers, and Pittsburgh Pirates

Beginning in the spring of 2011 Augustine's Pizza was contracted to supply Aramark concessions at   PNC Park in Pittsburgh, Pennsylvania the home of the Pittsburgh Pirates of Major League Baseball.  On August 19, 2011 Augustine's Pizza sponsored a free T-shirt giveaway promotion at PNC Park, which featured Pirates centerfielder Andrew McCutchen on the front of the shirt, and the Augustine's Pizza logo on the back.

References

External links
Official site
 

Companies based in Lawrence County, Pennsylvania
Restaurants established in 1957
1957 establishments in Pennsylvania
New Castle, Pennsylvania
Frozen food brands